Kadari Satyanarayan Reddy, commonly known by his nom de guerre, Kosa, was a Central Committee member of the Communist Party of India (Maoist), a banned Maoist insurgent communist party in India.

Family 
In 1984, Kosa was married to Radha; soon after their marriage, Kosa decided to have a vasectomy, as the couple consciously concluded that "it was very difficult to have children and fight a guerrilla warfare." Kosa has told media that "Maoist cadres did not force their women to undergo sterilisation operation but they themselves opt for tubectomy."

Guerrilla life 
In an interview with the media, one of the officials of Central Reserve Police Force (CRPF) has described Kosa as "very good with arms and ammunition and a master at guerrilla warfare.

He is a former secretary of Dandakaranya Special Zone Committee and a former "military commander" of CPI (Maoist), and has been appointed by the Central Regional Bureau of the political party to "fill the void" left after Kishenji's elimination in the ongoing Maoist movement in the region. After Kosa was promoted to the Central Committee of the party, Ramanna replaced him as the head of its Dandakaranya Special Zone Committee.

In 2009 NDTV claimed that Kosa was "one of the top five Maoist leaders in India. Kosa has stated that the Maoists "only pick up arms in self-defence."

Kosa was killed on 15 October 2019 in Sukma district, Chhattisgarh in an encounter with security forces.

See also 

 Marxism
 Leninism
 Marxism-Leninism-Maoism
 Naxalism
 People's war
 New Democratic Revolution
 Naxalite-Maoist insurgency
 Anand
 Anuradha Ghandy
 Azad
 Charu Majumdar
 Ganapathy
 Kobad Ghandy
 Kondapalli Seetharamaiah
 Narmada Akka
 Prashant Bose

References

External links 
 International Campaign Against War on the People in India

Video

 We are not violent, says Naxal leader, NDTV

Anti-revisionists
Indian guerrillas
Communist Party of India (Maoist) politicians
Naxalite–Maoist insurgency